Hafif Müzik is the third album of Turkish alternative rock band Vega, released by Sony Music/GRGDN in 2005.

Track listing
 K-9
 Elimde değil (Can't help it)
 Serzenişte 
 Mendil (Handkerchief)
 Yalnızca ben, yüzlerce sen (Me by myself, you a hundred times)	
 Uçları kırık (Broken ends)
 Yok (Nope)
 Hafif Müzik (Light Music)
 Yanıyor Zaman 
 O şarkı (That song)
 Sokaklar tekin değil (Not the streets)
 Ankara

Album information

Personnel

 Supervising producer: Hadi Elazzi, Selim Serezli
 Producer:Tuğrul Akyüz, Serkan Hökenek
 Arrangement: 
 Serkan Hökenek & Vega,
 Serkan Hökenek & Haluk Kurosman (03)
 Recording: Haluk Kurosman, Serkan Hökenek
 Mastering Çağlar Türkmen (sestrem)
 Mix: Alp Turaç (atm)
 Mix assistant: Erim Arkman (atm)
 Design: www.b-11.org
 Photography: Şafak Taner

Featured musicians
 Tuğrul Akyüz: guitar, bass guitar, keyboard, backing vocals
 Deniz Özbey: vocals
 Ilker Ölmez: Bass guitar (01, 04, 05, 07, 10)

External links
 Vega official site 
 GRGDN official site

Vega (band) albums
2005 albums